is a passenger railway station located in Takatsu-ku, Kawasaki, Kanagawa Prefecture, Japan, operated by the East Japan Railway Company (JR East).

Lines
Kuji Station is served by the Nambu Line.

Station layout
The station consists of two opposed side platforms serving two tracks, connected by a footbridge. The station is staffed.

Platforms

History 
The stop was raised in status to that of a full station on 16 April 1942.
Along with nationalization of Nambu Railway, the station became Kuji Station of Japanese Government Railway Nambu Line on 1 April 1944, and part of the  Japan National Railways (JNR) from 1946.
Along with privatization and division of JNR, JR East started operating the station on 1 April 1987.

Passenger statistics
In fiscal 2019, the station was used by an average of 14,523 passengers daily (boarding passengers only).

The passenger figures (boarding passengers only) for previous years are as shown below.

Surrounding area
 Kanagawa Prefectural Mukainooka Technical High School
 Kawasaki Municipal Midorigaoka Cemetery 
 Higashitakane Forest Park

See also
 List of railway stations in Japan

References

External links

  

Railway stations in Kanagawa Prefecture
Railway stations in Japan opened in 1927
Railway stations in Kawasaki, Kanagawa